These railways constructed by the Public Works Department of Western Australia were operated by the Western Australian Government Railways after construction.

References

Further reading
 

Public Works Department
Public Works Department (Western Australia)
Western Australia-related lists